Oklahoma City University School of Law, also known as OCU Law, is the law school of Oklahoma City University. OCU Law is located in Oklahoma City, Oklahoma and was founded in 1907. OCU Law was located in the Sarkeys Law Center on the southwest side of the Oklahoma City University campus until Spring 2015, when it moved to a new campus near downtown Oklahoma City.

The Chickasaw Nation Law Library at OCU Law houses a collection of more than 300,000 volume and volume equivalents, and is open to the public. OCU Law has been accredited by the ABA since 1960 and has been a member of the Association of American Law Schools since 2003.

The 2022 edition of U.S. News & World Report's Best Law Schools listed OCU Law as a 4th Tier Law School ranked #147-193 among 204 ABA accredited schools.  OCU Law was also listed under the outstanding category in the 2010 edition of the Princeton Review's best law schools release. The IRLG ranked OCU Law #52 overall in its 2009 ranking of law schools, based upon the percentage of graduates who pass the bar exam. IRLG also ranked it #107 overall, in its ranking of law schools, based upon the 57.2 percentage of prospective applicants who are accepted.

According to OCU Law's 2014 ABA-required disclosures, 91.3% of the Class of 2014 were employed nine months after graduation and 88% of the class was employed in bar passage required or J.D. advantage positions. OCU Law was ranked in the first quartile for 2013 employment stats by Moody's Investors Services. The report issued in May 2014 ranked all U.S. law schools based solely on their most recent graduating class' employment in J.D. required or J.D. preferred positions.

History
The law school has educated judges, political figures and founders of prestigious private law firms.  Due to its long tradition of providing evening and part-time schedule options, the law school has also produced highly successful business leaders, particularly in the real estate, engineering, and oil and gas industries. The student body commonly includes medical doctors, university professors, military officers, and professionals from other fields.  The School of Law is a member of the Association of American Law Schools and has been accredited by the American Bar Association since 1960.

The current dean of Oklahoma City University School of Law is Jim Roth, former member of Oklahoma Corporation Commission. His predecessor Dean Valerie Couch former U.S. Federal Magistrate for The Western District Court of Oklahoma, who succeeded Lawrence Hellman, who succeeded Rennard Strickland, a noted legal historian and former Dean of the University of Oregon School of Law, and the Honorable Robert Harlan Henry,  United States Court of Appeals for the Tenth Circuit.

Publications at the Oklahoma City University School of Law
Students of the Juris Doctor (JD) program are involved in preparing and publishing:
Oklahoma City University Law Review - The Law Review is published three times a year.  It has been published for more than 40 years and includes articles from professors, practitioners, judges, and OCU Law students.  The OCU Law Review provides the opportunity for students to write and edit scholarly articles while being exposed to viewpoints and commentaries written by authors from the United States, as well as internationally.  Membership is highly selective and third-year members have the opportunity to serve on the Law Review’s Board of Editors.  Service on the law review is an integral part of the educational experience for those students selected for it.  In recent years, the law review has published symposia on topics of importance to Oklahoma practitioners. The OCU Law Review is ranked in the first tier of law journals according to the Global Jurist.
Oklahoma Tribal Court ReportsConference on Consumer Finance Quarterly Report

Academics 
The School of Law offers Juris Doctor programs for full-time and part-time students. In addition, Oklahoma City University School of  Law offers students the ability to obtain a joint J.D./M.B.A., a joint J.D./M.A. in Non-profit Organizations and Leadership and a J.D./M.P.A degree. Oklahoma City University School of Law also offers a Master in Legal Studies degree.

Programs

Oklahoma Innocence Project
The Oklahoma Innocence Project (OIP) at Oklahoma City University School of Law is the only Innocence Clinic in the state. Law students participating in the innocence clinic assist the OIP legal staff with identifying and rectifying wrongful convictions in the state of Oklahoma.

Judge Alfred P. Murrah Center for Homeland Security Law & Policy
In conjunction with the school's move downtown in Spring 2015, Oklahoma City University School of Law opened the Judge Alfred P. Murrah Center for Homeland Security Law & Policy, an academic and practical resource center that examines the unique legal issues central to protecting and securing our nation, with a particular focus on the prevention of domestic terrorism. The Center works in close partnership with the Oklahoma City National Memorial & Museum, and includes former Oklahoma governor Frank Keating and former U.S. Department of Homeland Security General Counsel Joe Whitley as co-chairs of the Center's board.

Alternative Dispute Resolution Center
Oklahoma City University School of Law provides a negotiation, mediation, and arbitration program designed to settle disputes in lieu of litigation in the Courts.

American Indian Law & Sovereignty Center
The American Indian Law & Sovereignty Center is an academic law and policy center focusing on the complexities of American Indian law and tribal law. The Sovereignty Center provides services for tribal governments and stakeholders and offers direct legal services to individuals through the American Indian Wills Clinic.

Center on State Constitutional Law and Government
The Center on State Constitutional Law and Government was founded to develop and implement programs dedicated to the improvement of state constitutions and state governance.

Externship program
Oklahoma City University School of Law's prime location downtown leads to numerous opportunities for students to discover new and interesting aspects of the law through 80-plus externship sites. New sites are added regularly and each site has multiple placements. The School of Law offers five different externship focus areas: Corporate Counsel, Government Practice, Judicial, Litigation Practice and Native American.

Employment
 
According to OCU Law's official 2013 ABA-required disclosures,  91.8% of the Class of 2013 was employed in some capacity while 1.2% were pursuing graduate degrees and 5.3% were unemployed nine months graduation.

Costs
 
Tuition at Oklahoma City University School of Law is $1,065 per credit hour. Other expenses include: general fees, parking and security fee, Student Bar Association fee, Installment Plan Fee, Installment Finance Fee and a Finance Fee.

Notable alumni and students

References

External links
 

Law, School of
Law schools in Oklahoma
Educational institutions established in 1907
1907 establishments in Oklahoma